Tony Harnell (born September 18, 1962) is an American singer, best known for his work with Norwegian hard rock band TNT. He is also known for his wide vocal range, with his modal voice spanning over four octaves. In 2015, Harnell was briefly the frontman for heavy metal band Skid Row.

Biography
Harnell has an older half sister by his father. His mother, Constance Haldaman, was an opera singer while his father, Boyd Harnell, was a photojournalist. As a teenager, Tony Harnell was a professional skateboarder and avid surfer.

Early years
Harnell started singing at the age of 5. At 17 he joined his first band and spent the next three years in approximately fifteen bands including Bronx-based Jackals, a band of cultivated talent emerging from the guitarist's home basement that in a scant two years, gained enough popularity in the NYC area to fill rock clubs to capacity simply by word of mouth alone. This was the band in which Harnell was discovered.   At 18, Harnell started studying with vocal teacher Don Lawrence.

TNT
After a show in 1984, Harnell was introduced to record producer Mike Varney who mentioned a band in Norway, TNT, that was looking for a singer. Harnell was hired shortly after the band heard a demo tape of his vocals.

Harnell and guitarist Ronni Le Tekrø co-wrote all of TNT's material together during Harnell's 22-year run with the band. With Harnell, TNT recorded nine studio albums, two live videos and two "best of" compilations.

He left the band in April 2006 for personal and professional reasons. He performed his last show with the band on June 30, 2006, and a DVD was released that autumn that features the penultimate show in Madrid, Spain on April 1.

On October 17, 2013, Harnell announced that he had rejoined TNT.

After a year and a half absence, during which time, he fronted Skid Row, Harnell announced another return to TNT in May 2016.

Harnell would leave the band once again in October 2017 and was replaced by previous unknown Baol Bardot Bulsara.

Morning Wood
Morning Wood is an acoustic rock supergroup composed of Harnell, Al Pitrelli, Chuck Bonfonte, and Danny Mirada.

The act's album was first released in Japan in 1994 during TNT's first break-up and in 2002 was re-released in Europe credited to "Tony Harnell and Morning Wood."

Westworld
Westworld is a side project of Harnell's that also featured Mark Reale, Bruno Ravel, and John O'Reilly, with keyboardist Josh Pincus and violinist Mark Wood. Westworld has released three studio albums and a live album.

Starbreaker
Starbreaker is another band featuring Harnell and Magnus Karlsson. Some former members include John Macaluso, and Fabrizio Grossi. It released its first album in 2005. A second Starbreaker album, Love's Dying Wish, was released in 2008. The band never toured. A third Starbreaker album, Dysphoria, featuring Harnell and Karlsson among others, is scheduled for release in January 2019.

Sonic the Hedgehog
Harnell has done tracks for the Sonic the Hedgehog video game series. His first track for the series was "It Doesn't Matter" on the soundtrack of Sonic Adventure released in 1998 by SEGA. Harnell returned in 2001 to perform a rewritten version of the theme for Sonic in Sonic Adventure 2, as well as the first stage theme "Escape from the City" with Ted Poley. Following this in 2004, Harnell performed the Team Sonic theme for Sonic Heroes called "We Can", again with Poley and in 2011 he returned for Sonic Generations to perform two new remixes of "Escape from the City" with Poley. As of 2021, Harnell has also performed "Fly With Me", a theme song for the fan series "Sonic and Tails R" created by Emi Jones which featured many old cast members of the Sonic The Hedgehog video game series.

Solo career
In 2008, Harnell released his first solo material in demo form, the EP Cinematic, through his website.  It was followed in 2010 by the Round Trip album under the name Tony Harnell & The Mercury Train, a collection of re-recordings of classic Harnell songs from his previous bands TNT and Westworld in a  stripped-down acoustic format.  Harnell  released the digital single "Take What You're Giving" in 2011 before teaming up with guitarist Ron "Bumblefoot" Thal and others for the Tony Harnell & the Wildflowers featuring Bumblefoot album in 2013.

Skid Row
On April 6, 2015, it was announced that Johnny Solinger had left the American heavy metal band Skid Row. Hours later, the band announced that Harnell would be Solinger's replacement. On December 29, he announced that he had left Skid Row.

Discography

Solo
 Tony Harnell & Morning Wood - Morning Wood (1994)
 Cinematic - self-released (2008)
 Tony Harnell & The Mercury Train Round Trip (2010)
 Take What You're Giving - self-released (2011)
 Tony Harnell & the Wildflowers featuring Bumblefoot - Tony Harnell & the Wildflowers featuring Bumblefoot (2013)
 LoveKillers - LoveKillers feat. Tony Harnell (2019)

TNT
 Knights of the New Thunder (Eur, Jap 1984), (U.S. 1985)
 Tell No Tales (1987)
 Intuition (1989)
 Forever Shine On (1989)
 Realized Fantasies (1992)
 Three Nights in Tokyo (Live) (1992)
 Till Next Time – The Best of TNT (1995)
 Firefly (1997)
 Transistor (1999)
 The Big Bang – The Essential Collection (2003)
 Give Me A Sign (2003)
 My Religion (2004)
 All the Way to the Sun (2005)
 Live in Madrid (2006)

Westworld
 Westworld (1999)
 Skin (2000)
 Cyberdreams (2002)
 Live... In the Flesh (2001)

Starbreaker
 Starbreaker (2005)
 Love's Dying Wish (2008)
 Dysphoria (2019)

As featured artist
 Brazen Abbot – My Resurrection (2005)
 Magnus Karlsson's Free Fall – Free Fall (2013)
 Michael Sweet - I'm Not Your Suicide (2014)
 Magnus Karlsson's Free Fall – Kingdom of Rock (2015)

Skid Row
  18 and Life (2015) – single

References

External links

 Official website

American heavy metal singers
American male singers
Singers with a four-octave vocal range
Living people
TNT (Norwegian band) members
Musicians from San Diego
Skid Row (American band) members
Starbreaker (band) members
1962 births
Brazen Abbot members